De falsis diis, or, in Classical Latin spelling, De falsis deis ('on false gods'), is an Old English homily composed by Ælfric of Eynsham in the late tenth or early eleventh century. The sermon is noted for its attempt to explain beliefs in traditional Anglo-Saxon and Norse gods within a Christian framework through Euhemerisation. The homily was subsequently adapted and circulated by Wulfstan II, Archbishop of York, and also translated into Old Norse under the title ''Um þat hvaðan ótrú hófsk'' ('how false belief began').

The spelling De falsis diis tends to be used of Ælfric's text, and De falsis deis of Wulfstan's.

Ælfric's version 
Ælfric's sermon was based to a large degree on the sixth-century sermon De correctione rusticorum by Martin of Braga. At least seven Anglo-Saxon manuscripts contain parts of the sermon, the most complete being Cambridge, Corpus Christi College 178. The following summary is based on that of Arnold Taylor, and the line numbers refer to the edition by John C. Pope.

Wulfstan's adaptation 

Wulfstan II, Archbishop of York, adapted Ælfric's homily to how own style (as he did with a number of Ælfric's works). Wulfstan's version is also known as De falsis deis, as well as Homily XII. What made Wulfstan's approach unique was his calculated use of poetic devices and rhetorical style. A single manuscript copy survives in the Bodleian Library in Oxford, in the homiliary (collection of sermons) MS Hatton 113.

Influence 

There is evidence indicating that Wulfstan's homilies, such as De falsis deis, were copied at Winchester, Canterbury, Exeter, West Midlands and an unidentified library somewhere in the southeast. This suggests that during Wulfstan's own lifetime, and shortly afterwards, his manuscripts were influential enough to merit the labor-intensive process of copying them by hand. There were several major churches/libraries copying his works, proving that Wulfstan's works were not just popular in one centralized location, rather they were spread to many major cultural centers of England. Another impressive fact is that many later homilists continued to copy segments of Wulfstan's homilies into their own works. This was still happening even two centuries after Wulfstan had written them, which “suggests either that particular kudos attached to echoing the wording of Archbishop Wulfstan or that subsequent compilers recognized the stylistic power of Wulfstan’s work”. The fact that Wulfstan's manuscripts were distributed so widely and were so frequently used in later works points to the significance of his message.

Themes 

Though the church was always working towards the destruction of heathen practices, “change came about under varying conditions and with differing success” as people were not willing to quickly abandon the customs and traditions their people had had for generations. Evidence of this is the fact that Wolfstan's De falsis deis was based on Ælfric's De falsis diis, as was a later Icelandic homily called Um þat hvaðan ótrú hófst. Each of these homilies can, in turn, be traced back to Bishop Martin of Braga's De correctione rusticorum. This evidence, in addition to each author's perceived need to write a new homily, lead North to theorize “that the animism which Martin describes was widespread and long-lasting”. “Animism” is the worship of natural elements, which is particularly evident in De falsis deis in lines 13 through 18 when Wulfstan tells of that people believed the sun, the moon, stars, fire, water and earth were all gods. He then takes this a step further and also equates these beliefs with the teachings of the devil.

Similarly, the teachings of the devil are also said to apply to other deities revered by non-Christians, such as in lines 28-29 when Wulfstan describes how people worshipped “world-men” who then became powerful as a result. Another technique involved here is that of euhemerization, when ordinary people attain a god-like status. This is an important point for Wulfstan to make in order to convince non-Christians of the error of their ways; their deities could simply be explained away as deceitful humans. In this way, according to North, “…Wulfstan shows non-Christian beliefs to be a disorderly heap of abuses bereft of any intelligible form or purpose” (207). As for the “teachings of the devil” repeatedly referenced by Wulfstan, David Johnson points out that “when it comes to such euhemeristic discussions of the pagan deities, the concept of demonisation is almost always involved as well”.
            
Perhaps it is not so surprising that a homilist such as Wulfstan would try to demonize, or humanize, the deities of a culture they were trying to convert. After all, the Anglo-Saxons had only been converted a few hundred years beforehand, and “thousands of pagan Scandinavians had invaded and then stayed to settle in England”. The evidence of England's pagan roots was painfully evident in many places, from folklore to place names and practices. According to very comprehensive lists compiled by Wilson, there are twelve major place-names involving Odin, eight with Thor and three with Tiw in England that still exist to this day (11-12). If these names have been retained to the present day, one can only imagine the prevalence of pagan gods’ names used to name places in Wulfstan's time. Ælfric's “De falsis diis,” upon which Wulfstan's homily was based, also goes into some detail about the origins of the days of the week. These, too, derive names from pagan origins, such as the Danish goddess Fricg being used for “Friday”. Finally, Ælfric also specified in one of his works that “the singing of heathen songs at a funeral is forbidden,” indicating the prevalence of Scandinavian pagan traditions into a Christian era. Though Ælfric and Wulfstan both make many references to Roman gods, both take care to connect them with their Scandinavian counterparts. However, both Wulfstan and Ælfric use an anglicized form of Óðinn (Óðan and Oðon, respectively) rather than the Scandinavian form. This could indicate two interesting points: one, that they were unwilling to associate their ancestors with heathens like the Danes, or two, that they were refraining from informing readers that Óðan/Oðon was the same figure from whom nobility and royalty of their time claimed lineage.

Style 
Wulfstan's homilies were intended not to be read, but for public delivery. This necessitated many devices for clarity, “…notably a rephrasing of expressions which might be misunderstood, introduced by þæt is”. One such rephrasing appears at lines 74-75 (An is ælmihtig God on þrym hadum, þæt is fæder and suna and halig gast) when he tries to explain the holy trinity, a concept that might confuse lay-people. Another notable feature of Wulfstan's work is the large number of intensifying words...such as æfre, swyðe ealles to swyðe, georne, mid rihte, ofer ealle oðre þing, swyðe georne, oft and gelome, wide, witode. While several of these examples are present within De falsis deis, one marker, swyðe, was particularly evident, showing up in lines 2 (twice), 37, 38, 41, 53, 66 and 73. Rhyme can also be found within De falsis deis at line 47 when it lists and saca and wraca. There are also an abundance of instances in which Wulfstan used alliteration, such as line 29 (woruldmen þe mihtige wurdan on woruldafelum”) and line 42 (“se sunu wæs swaþeah swyðor). Alliteration and rhyme were prevalent in many works of Wulfstan’s time, and Betherum points out that “alliterative and rhyming pairs of words…became so ingrained that when [Wulfstan] rewrote another person’s composition…the substitution of two words for one is almost invariable” (232). Other elements indicative of Wulfstan’s style include word or sentence parallelism, alliteration and rhyme. Sentence parallelism occurs in lines 9, 12, 14, 42, 56 and 64 with the expression þurh deofles lare. Repetition of such a phrase indicates its importance to listeners, who will then be more likely to remember these points. A great example of word parallelism can be found in line 25, mid muðe and mid modes. In short, Bethurum was quite accurate when she stated that Wulfstan “did not rely upon the inspiration of the moment; his effects are carefully planned” (233).

Certainly Wulfstan must have been a very talented writer, gaining a reputation of eloquence while he still lived in London. In a letter to him, “the writer asks to be excused from translating something Wulfstan had asked him to render into English and pleads as an excuse his lack of ability in comparison with the bishop’s skill” (58). Similarly, “[o]ne early student of Wulfstan, Einenkel, and his latest editor, Jost, agree in thinking he wrote verse and not prose”. This suggests Wulfstan's writing is not only eloquent, but poetic, and among many of his rhetorical devices, another is marked rhythm (229). Taking a look at Wulfstan's actual manuscripts, presented by Volume 17 of Early English Manuscripts in Facsimile, it becomes apparent that his writing was exceptionally neat and well-structured – even his notes in the margins are well-organized and tidy, and his handwriting itself is ornate but readable.

Wulfstan's style is highly admired by many sources, easily recognizable and exceptionally distinguished. “Much Wulfstan material is, more-over, attributed largely or even solely on the basis of his highly idiosyncratic prose style, in which strings of syntactically independent two-stress phrases are linked by complex patterns of alliteration and other kinds of sound play. Indeed, so idiosyncratic is Wulfstan’s style that he is even ready to rewrite minutely works prepared for him by Ǣlfric”. From this identifiable style, 26 sermons can be attributed to Wulfstan, 22 of which are written in Old English, the others in Latin. However, it's suspected that many anonymous materials are Wulfstan's as well, and his handwriting has been found in many manuscripts, supplementing or correcting material (495). He wrote more than just sermons, including law-codes and sections of prose.

Wulfstan's version: text and translation

Old English 
(The Old English text is reproduced here from The Cambridge Old English Reader by Richard Marsden, pages 205-208.)

 
 
 
 
 
 
 
 
 
 
 
 
wurðedon him for godas þa sunnan and ðone monan for heora scinendan

Literal Translation 
 Alas, long ago is that because of devil many things went wrong and that mankind too
 greatly God disobeyed and that heathenism all [together] too wide greatly did harm
 and still does harm widely. Not read we however anywhere in books that man established
 any heathen-pay (idolatry) anywhere in world/age in all the time that was before Noah's
 flood. Nevertheless, later it happened that Nimrod and the giants built the
 wonderful tower after Noah's flood, and for them then as many language occurred,
 thus the book says, as there maker was. Then afterwards dispersed they wide
 across the land and mankind then directly mightily waxed/increased. And then at last became they
 deceived through the old devil that Adam long ago formerly betrayed, as that they made
 perversely and heretically for themselves heathen gods and the true God and their
 own creator scorned who they as men created and made.
 They took also him then it as wisdom, through devil's teaching, that they
 worshipped for gods the sun and the moon for their shiny
 brightness and them sacrifices then before not-know through devil's learning sacrifice and abandoned
 their Lord who they created and made. Some men also said about the
 shiny stars that they gods were and began they become keenly
 and some they believed also in fire from their sudden heat, some also in water,
 and some they believed in the earth, because she all things nourish. But
 they could readily understand, if they knew that reason, that he is true God
 who all these things shaped us men to enjoy and to use because of his great
 goodness that he mankind granted. These created things also all do just as they
 directed their own creator and not-be able none thing do without our Lord's
 consent, therefore he none other creator is not without the only true God that we
 in believe and we he alone over all other thing love and worship with
 sure faith, utter with mouth and with hearth's conviction that
 he alone is true God who all thing created and made.
 Yet then heathens would not be restricted to as few gods as
 they before had but took to worshipping nearest various giants and violent
 world-men who mighty became in world-powers and awe-inspiring were as
 long as they lived, and their own desires foully followed. One
 man was in year(former)-days living on the island that Crete is called he was
 Saturn named, and he was so savage that he did away with his own children,
 all without one, and un-fatherlike made their lives to destruction early in youth.
 He left nevertheless reluctantly one alive, nevertheless when he did away with the brother
 otherwise, and he was Jove called and he became savage fiend. He expelled his
 own father after from the same fore-said(aforementioned) island that Crete is called and would him
 destroy eagerly if he could. And this Jove became so greatly wanton that he took
 his own sister as a wife; she was named Juno became greatly
 exalted goddess according to heathen reckoning. Her two daughters were Minerva
 and Venus. These wicked men that we about speak were old for the
 greatest gods then in those days and the heathens worshipped them greatly through
 devil's teaching. But the son(Jove) was though more greatly in heathenism worshipped
 than the father(Saturn) was and he is considered also most honorable all the gods who then
 heathens in those days for gods had in their error. And he was called
 Thor by another name among some nations, whom Danish people love
 most and in their heresy worship eagerly. His son is called Mars, he
 made ever strife and contention and conflict and enmity he stirred up often.
 This wretch after his journey-forth(death) worshipped the heathens also for exalted god
 and as often as they went to war or wanted [to go] into battle, then offered they
 their sacrifice in advance to honor this false god. And they believed that he
 greatly could them assist in fighting, therefore who they battle and war
 love in when alive.
 Some man also was called Mercury in life, he was greatly crafty
 and, although fully plausible in speech, deceitful in deed and in trickeries. Him
 made the heathens be their reckoning also for themselves to renowned god and at ways’
 junctions him sacrifice offered often and frequently through devil's teaching and to high
 hills they brought often erringly praise-offerings. This false god was honorable also
 among all heathens in that day and he is Odin called by another name
 in Danish manner. Now said some of the Danish men in their heresy that he
 Jove was, and he Thor named, Mercury's son, and he(Mercury) Odin named, but they were
 not right, therefore that we read in book, both among heathens and in Christendom, that
 the evil Jove in truth is Saturn's son. And some woman named Venus, she was
 Jove's daughter and she was as foul and so wicked in lust that her own
 brother with her copulated, so the men say, through devil's teaching, and that evil[woman]
 worshipped the heathens also as exalted woman.
 Many also other heathen gods were in various ways devised and also likewise
 heathen goddesses were held in great honor through middle-earth mankind to
 ruin, but this was foremost however in heathenism told, although because
 they foully existed in the world. And the scheming devil who ever is treacherous towards
 mankind brought the heathen men in the profound error, so that they as
 vile[people] him to good chose who their foul list they to law for themselves set
 and in uncleanness their lives also lived then a while because he existed. But they were
 blessed who also such scorns and the true God loved and worshipped who
 all things created and made. One is almighty God in three persons, that is
 father and son and holy ghost. All the three names encompass the one divine might
 and [he] is the one eternal God, ruler and maker [of] all creation. Him ever be praised
 and honored in all world's world eternally without end. Amen.

Modern English Translation 
Alas, it is because of the devil that many things went wrong long ago, and mankind disobeyed God too greatly, and heathenism altogether did harm too greatly and still does widespread harm. However, we do not read anywhere in books that man established any idolatry anywhere in the world in the time before Noah's flood. Nevertheless, it happened later that Nimrod and the giants built a wonderful tower after Noah's flood, thus the book says that for them there were as many languages brought about as there were builders. Afterwards they dispersed far and wide across the land and at once mankind greatly increased. At least they became deceived by the old devil that betrayed Adam long ago, and they made perverse and heretical heathen gods for themselves and the true God, their own creator who made them as men, was scorned.

	Then they also took it as wisdom, through the devil's teaching, to worship the sun and moon for gods because of their shiny brightness, and they made sacrifices to them that they did not know before, but learned through devil's teaching, and abandoned their lord who created and made them. Some men also said that the shiny stars were gods and began some believed gods were also in fire because of the sudden heat, some also believed there were gods in water, and some believed gods were in the earth, because she nourishes all things. They could readily understand, if they possessed the reason, that God is the true God who created all of these things for us men to enjoy and to use because of the great goodness that he granted mankind. These created things also do just as they are directed by their own creator, and they are not able to do a single thing without our Lord's consent, therefore there is no other creator besides the only true God that we believe in, and we love and worship Him with sure faith over all other things, praising him with our mouths and with our heart's conviction that he alone is the true God who created and made all things.

	Yet heathens would not be restricted to as few gods as they had before, but took to worshipping various giants and violent men of the world who became mighty in worldly powers and were awe-inspiring while they lived, and they foully followed their own desires. One man was in former days living on the island that is called Crete, and he was named Saturn, and he was so savage that he did away with his own children, all except one, and unlike a father he destroyed their lives in their youth. He nevertheless reluctantly left one alive (though he did away with his brothers) who he was called Jove, and he became a savage fiend. He expelled his own father from the same aforementioned island called Crete, and he would have destroyed him eagerly if he could. This Jove became so wanton that he took his own sister as his wife; she was named Juno, and she became a greatly exalted goddess according to heathen reckoning. Her two daughters were Minerva and Venus. These wicked men that we speak of were told that these were the greatest gods then in those days, and they heathens worshipped them greatly through the devil's teaching. Bu Jove was worshipped more greatly in heathenism than Saturn was, and he is also considered to be the most honorable of all of the gods who the heathens, in their error, had for gods in those days. Also he was called by another name, Thor, between some nations, and the Danish people love him most and worship him eagerly in their heresy. His son is called Mars, he always made strife and contention and often stirred up conflict and enmity. After his death, the heathens worshipped this wretch for an exalted god and whenever they went to war or wanted to go to battle, they offered their sacrifice in advance to honor this false god. They believed that he could greatly assist them in battle, therefore they love him in battle and war when they are alive.

	There was also a man called Mercury, he was very crafty and deceitful in deed and trickeries, though his speech was fully plausible. The heathens made him a renowned god for themselves; at crossroads they offered sacrifices to him frequently and they often erringly brought praise-offerings to hilltops, all through the devil's teaching. This false god was honored among the heathens in that day, and he is also called by the name Odin in the Danish manner. Now some of the Danish men said in their error that he was Jove, that he named Thor, that he was Mercury's son, and that Mercury named him, but they were not right, for we read in books, both among heathens and in Christendom, that the evil Jove is, in truth, Saturn's son. And a woman named Venus, she was Jove's daughter and she was so foul and wicked in lust that she copulated with her own brother, or so the men say, through the devil's teaching, and the heathens also worshipped that evil woman as an exalted woman.

	Many other heathen gods were also devised in various ways, and likewise heathen goddesses were held in great honor through middle earth, bringing mankind to ruin; however, this was taught in heathenism because they foully existed in the world. The scheming devil who is ever treacherous to mankind brought the heathen men into profound heresy, so that they thought vile people were good and made their foul lusts as a law for themselves and they also lived their lives in uncleanness then because he existed. But they were blessed who scorned such and who loved and worshipped the true God that created and made all things. The almighty God is one in three persons, that is the father, the son and the holy ghost. All three of the names encompass the one divine might and he is the one eternal God, ruler and maker of all creation. He shall ever be praised and honored forever and ever in a world without end. Amen.

Old Norse translation: Um þat hvaðan ótrú hófsk 
This Old Norse text is based largely on the sections of De falsis diis that concern the world before the arrival of Jesus. It survives now only in the Norwegian-Icelandic manuscript Hauksbók, in a section written during 1302–10, but may be much older.

Editions
 John Frankis, From Old English to Old Norse: A Study of Old English Texts Translated into Old Norse with an Edition of the English and Norse versions of Ælfric's 'De Falsis Diis', Medium Ævum Monographs, 33 (Oxford: Society for the Study of Medieval Languages and Literature, 2016)

Notes

References
D. Berthrurum, ‘Wulfstan’, in Continuations and Beginnings: Studies in Old English Literature, ed. E. G. Stanley (London, 1966), pp. 210–46

T. Hofstra, L. A. J. R. Houwen and A. A. MacDonald, Pagans and Christians: the Interplay between Christian Latin and Traditional Germanic Cultures in Early Medieval Europe, Germania Latina 2 (Groningen, 1995)
 
R. Marsden, The Cambridge Old English Reader (Cambridge, 2004)

R. North, Heathen Gods in Old English Literature, CSASE 22 (Cambridge, 1997)

E. G. Stanley, The Search for Anglo-Saxon Paganism (Cambridge, 1975)
 
J. Wilcox, ‘The Dissemination of Wulfstan’s Homilies: the Wulfstan Tradition in Eleventh-Century Vernacular Preaching’, in England in the Eleventh Century, Proceedings of the 1990 Harlaxton Symposium, ed. C. Hicks (Stamford, 1992), pp. 199–217
 
D. Wilson, Anglo-Saxon Paganism (London 1992)

Bethurum, Dorothy. The Homilies of Wulfstan. Oxford: Clarendon Press, 1957. Print.

Continuations and Beginnings. Ed. Eric Gerald Stanley. London: Thomas Nelson and Sons LTD, 1966. Print.

Early English Manuscripts in Facsimile. Ed. Peter Clemoes. Vol. 17. Copenhagen: Rosenkilde and Bagger International Booksellers and Publishers, 1971. Print.

Lapidge, Michael. The Blackwell Encyclopedia of Anglo-Saxon England. Oxford: Blackwell Publishers Ltd., 2001. Print.

 

Christian sermons
Bodleian Library collection
Old English literature
Historicity of religious figures
Anglo-Saxon paganism
Norse paganism